Odorrana kuangwuensis (common names: Kuang-wu Shan frog, Kuangwu odorous frog) is a species of frog in the family Ranidae that is endemic to China. It is found in northeastern  Sichuan and northwestern Hubei. Its name refers to the type locality, Mount Guangwu (="Kuang-wu" in older romanization) in Nanjiang County, northern Sichuan.

Its natural habitats are large streams in hill forests. It is threatened by habitat loss.

References

Kuangwuensis
Amphibians described in 1966
Amphibians of China
Endemic fauna of China
Taxonomy articles created by Polbot